Cupidesthes jacksoni, the Jackson's ciliate blue, is a butterfly in the family Lycaenidae. It is found in Ivory Coast and Ghana. The habitat consists of wet forests.

Adults of both sexes have been found on the flowers of Eupatorium species.

References

Butterflies described in 1969
Lycaenesthini